Charles Edward (Leopold Charles Edward George Albert, ; 19 July 1884 – 6 March 1954) was the last sovereign duke of Saxe-Coburg and Gotha, from 30 July 1900 until 1918. A male-line grandson of Queen Victoria and Prince Albert, he was also until 1919 a Prince of the United Kingdom and from birth held the British titles of Duke of Albany, Earl of Clarence and Baron Arklow.

Charles Edward spent his childhood years in the United Kingdom but was sent to Germany in his mid-teens, and received the final years of his education there, after in 1900 unexpectedly inheriting the throne of the Duchy of Saxe-Coburg and Gotha in the German Empire, due to the early deaths of his cousin Alfred, Hereditary Prince of Saxe-Coburg and Gotha, and his uncle Duke Alfred. He took full responsibility for the role in 1905. His style of governance was considered to be loyal to the emperor and somewhat autocratic. He also supported art, science and local industry.

During the First World War, Charles Edward's support for his adoptive country led to him being viewed with increased hostility in Britain and ultimately losing his British titles, while in Germany, the end of the Empire led to the loss of his constitutional position. After this, he drifted towards far-right politics, and later became involved in the Nazi regime. After the Second World War, he was fined by a Denazification court and lost ownership of land in the Soviet occupation zone of Germany (later East Germany). Charles Edward died in poverty in Coburg, which by then was part of Bavaria in West Germany, in 1954.

Early life in Britain

 Prince Charles Edward was born at Claremont House near Esher, Surrey. His father was Prince Leopold, Duke of Albany, the eighth child of Queen Victoria and Prince Albert. His mother was Princess Helen of Waldeck and Pyrmont, the fourth daughter of George Victor of Waldeck and Pyrmont and of his first wife Princess Helena of Nassau. Prince Leopold had suffered from hemophilia but a boy cannot inherit the condition from his father so Charles Edward was healthy. As Leopold had died before Charles Edward's birth, Prince Charles Edward succeeded to his titles at birth and was styled His Royal Highness the Duke of Albany.

After falling ill, the young royal duke was baptised privately at Claremont on 4 August 1884, two weeks after his birth, and publicly in Esher Parish Church on 4 December 1884 four months later. His godparents were Queen Victoria (his paternal grandmother), the Prince of Wales (his paternal uncle), Princess Christian of Schleswig-Holstein and the Marchioness of Lorne (his paternal aunts), Princess Frederica of Hanover (his father's second cousin), Alexis, Prince of Bentheim and Steinfurt (his uncle, who was unable to attend the event) and George Victor, Prince of Waldeck and Pyrmont (his maternal grandfather, who also could not attend).

Charles Edward was educated as a Prince of the United Kingdom for his first 15 years. As a grandson of Queen Victoria, the Duke was a first cousin of George V and of several European royal figures: Queen Maud of Norway, Grand Duke Ernest Louis of Hesse, Empress Alexandra of Russia, Queen Marie of Romania, Crown Princess Margaret of Sweden, Queen Victoria Eugenia of Spain, Emperor Wilhelm II of Germany, Queen Sophia of the Hellenes, Queen Wilhelmina of the Netherlands, and Josias, Hereditary Prince of Waldeck and Pyrmont (the last two through his mother). Such was the interest Wilhelm II showed in his young cousin's upbringing that Charles Edward was known among the Imperial Court as "the Emperor's seventh son". His mother frequently reminded him of the importance of "becoming a good man, so you bring no shame on Papa's name".

 His education began under the tutelage of Miss Potts at Claremont; he then went to two prep schools, firstly at Sandroyd School, which was then located in Surrey, and then at Park Hill School in Lyndhurst where according to his sister he was "under the care of Mr W. F. Rawnsley, which was a very happy period of Charlie's life." After the school in Lyndhurst, he went to Eton, where he was in Arthur Benson's House. He was happy at Eton and looked back nostalgically at his time at that school throughout his life.

Duke of Saxe-Coburg and Gotha

Accession and education in Germany 
In 1899, the House of Saxe-Coburg and Gotha, urged by Kaiser Wilhelm II, decided on how to deal with the succession of Duke Alfred, who was in ill health. His only son, Prince Alfred ("Young Affie"), had died in February 1899. Prince Arthur, Duke of Connaught and Strathearn, the Queen's third son, was serving in the British army, causing Wilhelm II to oppose him as a ruling prince of Germany. His son, Prince Arthur of Connaught, had been at Eton with Charles Edward. Wilhelm II demanded a German education for the boy, but this was unacceptable to the Duke of Connaught. Thus young Arthur also renounced his claims to the Duchy. Next in line was Charles Edward, who consequently inherited the ducal throne of Saxe-Coburg and Gotha at the age of sixteen when his uncle Alfred died at the age of 55 in July 1900.

His sister Alice wrote: "It was a very great heartbreak for my mother that my brother had to succeed to Coburg. 'I have always tried to bring Charlie up as a good Englishman,' she once said, 'and now I have to turn him into a good German.'" Though she had previously hoped he would have an Oxford education, the Dowager Duchess of Albany "reluctantly" decided that "Charlie should accept – and he was too young to resist."

With his mother and sister, Charles Edward moved to Germany when he was fifteen, although he spoke no German. Duke Alfred (who was then still alive) wanted to separate the boy from his mother so she took him to stay with her brother-in-law Wilhelm of Württemberg and found him a tutor. He later followed an education plan by Wilhelm II, attending the Preußische Hauptkadettenanstalt (Prussian Central Cadet Institute) at Lichterfelde, studied at Bonn University and became a member of Corps Borussia Bonn. He also joined the 1st Garderegiment zu Fuß at Potsdam and spent some time at the German court in Berlin. His uncle, King Edward VII, made him a Knight of the Garter on 15 July 1902, just prior to his 18th birthday. Charles Edward became popular in Coburg but didn't enjoy his time in Berlin where the emperor seemed to have become resentful of him and frequently bullied him.

Reign 

From 1900 to 1905, Charles Edward reigned through the regency of Ernst, Hereditary Prince of Hohenlohe-Langenburg, the husband of Duke Alfred's third daughter Alexandra. The regent acted under the strict guidance of Emperor Wilhelm II. Upon coming of age on 19 July 1905, Charles Edward assumed full constitutional powers. He proved loyal to the Emperor and was deemed a constitutionally-minded prince. However, he soon deviated from his early liberal views and gave in to autocratic impulses, also becoming dependent on advisers at his two courts at Gotha and Coburg, between which political differences and rivalries had developed. He liberally supported the court theatres in both towns. Taking an interest in Zeppelin and aeroplane technology, Charles Edward supported the newly created aircraft industry at Gotha (see Gothaer Waggonfabrik). Like all Dukes of Saxe-Coburg and Gotha, he divided his time between the two towns. Among his Schloss Friedenstein, Ehrenburg Palace, and Schloss Callenberg residences, he favoured the last. He also took great interest in the renovation of Veste Coburg, which had been abandoned as a ducal residence in the 17th century. This work, which strained the ducal finances, lasted from 1908 until 1924.

The Duke was not without sympathy for his native United Kingdom, visiting often and remaining on good terms with the British royal family. World War I caused a conflict of loyalties for Charles Edward, but he finally decided to support the German Empire. On holiday in England when the war started, he told his sister that he wanted to fight for Great Britain but felt obligated to return his duchies where public opinion was turning against the Duke due to his English origins. He broke off relations with his family at the British and Belgian courts; this did not suffice to overcome doubts about his loyalties in Germany. Incapable of active combat due to a lame leg, Charles Edward served on the staff of an infantry division of the German army at the beginning of the war, fighting Russians in East Prussia. In 1915, he had to stop due to rheumatism. Although he never held a command, he visited both the western and eastern fronts numerous times. Soldiers from his duchies were awarded the Carl-Eduard-Kriegskreuz. He was always supportive of soldiers from those territories and his attitudes would become in general more sincerely pro-German as the war years progressed. In 1917, a law change in Coburg effectively banned Charles Edward's British relatives from succeeding him and that same year the Gotha G.V bomber which had been built in Gotha was used to attack London. In Britain, he was denounced as a traitor. In 1915, King George V, his cousin, ordered his name removed from the register of the Most Noble Order of the Garter. The Titles Deprivation Act 1917 began the process of removing his British titles.

Weimar Republic 
The Russian Revolution of 1917 caused Charles much concern, and he watched anxiously during the ensuing power struggles between the left- and right-wing parties in Germany. On the morning of 9 November 1918, during the German Revolution, the Workers' and Soldiers' Council of Gotha declared him deposed. On 11 November, his abdication was demanded in Coburg. Only on 14 November, later than most other ruling princes, did he formally announce that he had "ceased to rule" in both Gotha and Coburg. He did not explicitly renounce his throne, but no longer had a right to rule. The following year, he also lost his British titles, though some personal sympathy remained for him among the political establishment in the United Kingdom, due to the way German nationality had been forced on him as a teenager.
A similar solution for Gotha took longer, and only after legal struggles with the Free State of Thuringia was it set up in 1928–34. The Gotha foundation was expropriated by the Soviet authorities after 1945. After 1919, the family retained Schloss Callenberg, some other properties (including those in Austria), and a right to live at Veste Coburg. It also received substantial financial compensation for lost possessions. Some additional real estate in Thuringia was restored to the ducal family in 1925.

Effectively exiled from the UK, and fearful of the communist threat, Charles Edward started looking for a new political home. He also worked towards the restoration of the monarchy, thus supporting the nationalistic-conservative and völkisch right. Now a private citizen, Charles Edward became associated with various right-wing paramilitary and political organisations. These organisations were associated with violent repression, anti-government activities and politically motivated murders. He supported Hermann Ehrhardt, both morally and financially, after the Freikorps' commander's participation in the failed Kapp Putsch. It was rumoured that Charles Edward wanted to return to political power as "King of Thuringia".

Charles Edward met Adolf Hitler for the first time on 14 October 1922, at the Nazis' second  held at Coburg. When the Wiking joined Der Stahlhelm, Charles Edward became a member of the Stahlhelm's national board.

In 1932, Charles Edward's daughter Sibylla married Prince Gustaf Adolf, Duke of Västerbotten, the eldest son of the Crown Prince of Sweden and second-in-line to the Swedish throne. The marriage meant that Sibylla would, in the normal course, become Queen of Sweden. The engagement was announced on 16 June 1932 and the wedding was celebrated on 19 October 1932. That same year, Charles Edward took part in the creation of the Harzburg Front, through which the German National People's Party became associated with the Nazi Party. He also publicly called on voters to support Hitler in the presidential election of 1932.

Nazi Germany 
Charles Edward formally joined the Nazi Party in March 1933, and that same year, became a member of the SA (Brownshirts), rising to the rank of Obergruppenführer by 1936. From 1936 to 1945, he served as a member of the Reichstag, representing the Nazi Party, and was president of the German Red Cross from December 1933 to 1945. By the time he took over the position, the German Red Cross had already been placed under the Nazis' control. Under Charles Edward's leadership, the German Red Cross reduced its interest in improving the welfare of the civilian population in order to focus on military matters and introduced various displays of allegiance towards the regime. His deputy Ernst Robert Grawitz was involved in human experimentation in the concentration camps.

In 1934, Charles Edward visited Japan, where he attended a conference on the protection of civilians during war, and delivered Hitler's birthday greeting to Emperor Hirohito. By 1936, he had agreed to be a spy for Hitler while attending the funeral of his first cousin George V at Sandringham, but he was unreliable, according to a historian, "telling them what they wanted to hear". Records indicate that Charles Edward received a monthly payment from the Führer of 4,000 Reichsmark (worth about £16,000 in 2015). Hitler sent Charles Edward to Britain as president of the Anglo-German Friendship Society. His mission was to improve Anglo-German relations and explore the possibility of a pact between the two countries. He attended George V's funeral as Hitler's representative, in an SA uniform, complete with metal helmet, his British uniforms having been taken away when he was stripped of his British titles.

The Prince sent Hitler encouraging reports about the strength of pro-German sentiment among the British aristocracy and about the possibility of a Britain-Germany pact. Hitler also used him to encourage the pro-Nazi sentiments of the Duke of Windsor and his wife. "Carl Edward's British network was very useful for Hitler," according to the German historian Karina Urbach. However, other academics have argued that Charles Edward's advocacy had little success, and that he failed to understand the degree to which the people he had grown up around now saw him as a foreigner.

Urbach also said she found evidence of Charles Edward donating generously to the Nazi party for years, financing political murders and being aware of the death camps in Buchenwald. In 1945, the Führer ordered that he not be allowed to be captured because of the great deal of inside information that he possessed. According to The Guardian, he was aware of the death camps' work, and the programme that killed more than 100,000 disabled people in Germany, Austria, and other German-occupied territories from 1940 onwards.

In 1940, Charles Edward travelled via Moscow and Japan to the US, where he met President Roosevelt at the White House. In 1943, at Hitler's behest, Charles Edward asked the International Red Cross to investigate the Katyn massacre. Although Charles Edward was too old for active service during World War II, his three sons served in the Wehrmacht. His second son, Hubertus, was killed in action in 1943 in a plane crash on the Eastern Front near Mosty.

Aftermath of World War II 
When World War II ended, the American Military Government in Bavaria, under the command of General George S. Patton, placed Charles Edward under house arrest at his family's vast Veste Coburg, because of his Nazi sympathies.

Charles Edward was later imprisoned with other Nazi officials. His sister, Princess Alice, learning of his incarceration, came to Germany with her husband, the Earl of Athlone (then Governor General of Canada), to plead with his American captors for his release. They dined with the American generals holding her brother, who declined to release him.

Charles Edward was imprisoned until 1946, and was originally charged with crimes against humanity. Although exonerated of complicity in war crimes, he was judged to have been "an important Nazi". In 1950 (or August 1949, according to his Oxford Dictionary of National Biography entry), and after several appeals, Charles Edward was found by a denazification court to be a Mitläufer and Minderbelasteter (roughly translated as: follower and follower of lesser guilt).

Charles Edward also lost significant property as a result of his participation in World War II. Gotha was part of Thuringia, and therefore situated in the Soviet occupation zone. The Soviet Army confiscated much of the family's property in Gotha. However, Coburg had become part of Bavaria in 1920, and was occupied by American forces. As such the family was able to retain property in what would become West Germany. 

In April 1946, his daughter Sibylla gave birth to a son, the future Carl XVI Gustaf of Sweden, who became, upon birth, third in the line of succession to the Swedish throne. In January 1947, Sybilla's husband died in a plane crash, and in October 1950, Gustaf V of Sweden died, at which point Charles Edward's grandson became the Crown Prince of Sweden, who later became King Carl Gustaf.

Late life and death

Charles Edward spent the last years of his life in seclusion, forced into poverty by the fines he had been required to pay by the denazification tribunal, and the seizure of much of his property by the Soviets. In 1953, he viewed the coronation of his cousin's granddaughter, Elizabeth II, in a local cinema.

Charles Edward died of cancer in his flat in Elsässer Straße, Coburg, on 6 March 1954, at the age of 69, a "penniless criminal", according to one report. He was the penultimate ruling prince of the German Empire to die; only Ernst II of Saxe-Altenburg outlived him – see List of German monarchs in 1918. He is buried at the Waldfriedhof Cemetery (Waldfriedhof Beiersdorf) near Schloss Callenberg, in Beiersdorf near Coburg.

Marriage and family 

Wilhelm II chose Princess Victoria Adelaide of Schleswig-Holstein, the niece of his wife, Empress Augusta Victoria, as the bride of Charles Edward, who was her first cousin. She was the eldest daughter of Friedrich Ferdinand, Duke of Schleswig-Holstein, and Princess Karoline Mathilde of Schleswig-Holstein-Sonderburg-Augustenburg. They married on 11 October 1905, at Glücksburg Castle, Schleswig-Holstein, and had five children, including Sibylla, the mother of Carl XVI Gustaf of Sweden.

The family mainly spoke English at home, though the children learnt to speak German fluently. Hubertus, Charles Edward's second son, was the favourite child. The children lived in fear of their father, who ran his family "like a military unit". Charles Edward's younger daughter, Princess Caroline Mathilde, claimed that her father had sexually abused her. The allegation was backed by one of her brothers.

Honours and arms

Orders and decorations

Arms

Charles Edward was never granted arms in the United Kingdom. In addition, he did not inherit the arms of his father, since British royal arms, as a differenced version of Arms of Dominion, are granted individually and not inherited. On his accession as Duke of Saxe-Coburg and Gotha, he used the arms of that duchy, both the greater and lesser versions.

One variant that he used was a shield of the arms of Saxony, with a differenced version of the arms of the United Kingdom, charged with the label borne by his father on his father's arms (essentially, the arms of his father in reverse). This was similar to the arms borne by his uncle, Alfred, as Duke of Saxe-Coburg and Gotha, which can be seen on his stall plate as a Knight of the Swedish Order of the Seraphim.

Legacy

In December 2007, Britain's Channel 4 aired an hour-length documentary about Charles Edward called Hitler's Favourite Royal, including re-coloured original footage and photos from all stages of his private and public life, his troubled conversion to the National Socialist regime, and other aspects. Various international historians commented on the events and issues revolving around his life, reminding the public of his existence and reviving public debate. A review in The Guardian described the film as a "A solid documentary on a feeble man and a wretched family." Another review in The Telegraph suggested the documentary had been overly sympathetic to Charles Edward stating that the "story emerged as a tale of pure tragedy. Which it undoubtedly was, in parts." but that he was depicted "As if the trauma of being elevated to a dukedom and losing it had somehow robbed him of his ability to tell right from wrong."

Karina Urbach's 2015 book Go Betweens for Hitler discusses how various aristocrats including Charles Edward acted as informal diplomats for Nazi Germany. A review in The Times commented on Charles Edward that "For many years thereafter [the German Revolution], Carl Eduard was regarded as a mere footnote in history; a harmless, potty old aristocrat, washed up by the seismic upheavals of the early 20th century. However, that benign interpretation has been recently revised. We now know that Carl Eduard was a member of the Nazi party, a sponsor of paramilitary terrorism and — as Karina Urbach’s excellent book demonstrates — an important “go-between” for Hitler."

Issue

Ancestry

Notes and references

Sources

 Büschel, Hubertus (2016). Hitlers adliger Diplomat. S. Fischer Verlag, Frankfurt. .
 Sandner, Harald (2010). Hitlers Herzog: Carl Eduard von Sachsen-Coburg und Gotha: die Biographie. Aachen.

External links

 

|-

|-

|-

1884 births
1954 deaths
20th-century Freikorps personnel
Annulled Honorary Knights Grand Cross of the Royal Victorian Order
Barons Arklow
Dethroned monarchs
Dukes of Albany
Dukes of Saxe-Coburg and Gotha
Generals of Infantry (Prussia)
German monarchists
German Red Cross personnel
Grand Crosses of the Order of Saint Stephen of Hungary
House of Saxe-Coburg and Gotha (United Kingdom)
Knights of the Garter
Members of the Reichstag of Nazi Germany
Monarchs who abdicated
National Socialist Motor Corps members
Nazi Party officials
Nazi Party politicians
People from Esher
People stripped of a British Commonwealth honour
Princes of the United Kingdom
Protestant monarchs
Recipients of the Grand Cross of the Iron Cross
Sturmabteilung officers
Recipients of the Pour le Mérite (military class)
Red Cross personnel
Royalty in the Nazi Party